Lodi Unified School District is a school district headquartered in Lodi, California. It currently has roughly 28,396 students.

The district includes the following San Joaquin County communities: Lodi, Acampo, Lockeford, Terminous, Victor, and Woodbridge, as well as portions of northern Stockton, most of Morada, and a section of Dogtown.

Specifics
LUSD has 7 high schools, 10 middle schools and 38 elementary schools. Serving , LUSD was created in 1967 when voters approved a measure to merge 18 elementary districts and a union high school district. The district changed from a 'Concept-6' Year Round Calendar to that of a Modified Traditional Calendar in 2006 for most schools in the district with the creation of new schools.

Demographics

Schools

High schools
 Bear Creek High School
 Liberty High School
 Lodi High School
 Middle College High School
 Ronald E. McNair High School
 Plaza Robles High School
 Tokay High School
 Valley Robotics Academy

Middle schools
 Christa McAuliffe Middle School
 Delta Sierra Middle School
 Elkhorn School
 Henderson Community Day School
 Houston School
 Lodi Middle School
 Millswood Middle School
 Morada Middle School

Elementary schools
 Ansel Adams Elementary School
 Beckman Elementary School
 Borchart Elementary School
 Clairmont Elementary School
 Clements Elementary School
 Creekside Elementary School
 Davis Elementary School
 Elkhorn Elementary School
 Ellerth Larson Elementary School
 George Lincoln Mosher Elementary School
 Heritage Primary Elementary School
 Houston School
 Joe Serna Jr Charter School
 John Muir Elementary School
 Julia Morgan Elementary School
 Lakewood Elementary School
 Lawrence Elementary School
 Lockeford Elementary School
 Live Oak Elementary School
 Borchardt Elementary School
 Manlio Silva Elementary School
 George Lincoln Mosher Elementary
 Clyde Needham School
 Nichols Elementary School
 Oakwood Elementary School
 Parklane Elementary School
 Podesta Ranch Elementary
 Erma B. Reese Elementary School
 Sutherland Elementary
 Tokay Colony Elementary School
 Turner Elementary School
 Victor Elementary School
 Vinewood Elementary School
 Wagner Holt Elementary School
 George Washington Elementary School
 Westwood Elementary School
 Woodbridge Elementary School

References

External links
 

School districts in San Joaquin County, California
Education in Stockton, California
Unified School District